The 1404 papal conclave (October 10 to October 17) – the papal conclave of the time of the Great Western Schism, convened after the death of Pope Boniface IX, it elected Cardinal Cosimo Gentile Migliorati, who under the name of Innocent VII became the third pope of the Roman Obedience.

Cardinal electors

Pope Boniface IX died on October 1, 1404. At the time of his death, there were only 12 cardinals in the Roman Obedience of the Sacred College. Nine of them participated in the election of his successor:

All the electors were Italians. Five of them were elevated by Pope Urban VI, and four by Boniface IX.

Camerlengo of the Holy Roman Church was at that time Corrado Caraccioli, bishop of Mileto.

Absentee cardinals

Three cardinals, two created by Urban VI and one by Boniface IX, did not participate in this conclave:

Hungarian Alsani was the only non-Italian Cardinal in the Roman Obedience.

The election of Pope Innocent VII
Several churchmen and laymen urged "Roman" Cardinals not to elect the successor of Boniface IX and to recognise Benedict XIII of Avignon as Pope (or, at least, to wait for his death and then elect the new pope together with his adherents). Among the supporters of this point of view was Cardinal Protodeacon Ludovico Fieschi, who did not attend the conclave and later did not recognise its result.

In spite of this, nine cardinals present in Rome entered the conclave on October 10. Initially, they subscribed the conclave capitulation, which obliged whoever was elected to do everything possible (including abdication) in order to restore the unity of the Church. After seven days of deliberations Cardinal Cosimo Gentile Migliorati was unanimously elected pope and took the name of Innocent VII. Five days later Cardinal Fieschi officially abandoned the Roman Obedience and recognised Benedict XIII as true pope, so the rite of papal coronation on November 11 was performed by the new Protodeacon Landolfo Maramaldo.

Notes

Bibliography
Martin Souchon: Die Papstwahlen in der Zeit des grossen Schismas, Verlag von Benno Goeritz, 1888

External links
Salvador Miranda: List of participants of the papal conclave of 1404
Konklave 1404

1404
15th-century Catholicism
15th-century elections
1404
Western Schism